The Muslim Dabgar are a Muslim  community found in the state of Uttar Pradesh in India.

Origin

The word Dabgar is said to be derived from the Sanskrit word daravakarra, which means the makers of any spoon-shaped vessels. They are said to be a sub-group within the Hindu community. According to their own traditions, they were originally found in Rajasthan, and were soldiers. They took an oath to resist the Mughals, but were defeated. A section converted to Islam, from whom descend the Muslim Dabgar community.

Present times

The Dabgar are strictly endogamous, and marry close kin. Like their Hindu counterparts, the Muslim Dabgar community is also divided into a number of clans. Their main clans are the Punjabi and Delhiwal, but unlike the Hindu Dabgar, there is no prohibition in marrying within the clan. In fact, like other Uttar Pradesh Muslims, the community practice both cross cousin and parallel cousin marriages. The Dabgar are entirely Sunni, but also incorporate folk beliefs.

The Dabgar are still involved in their traditional occupation of manufacturing hide jars. They buy the hide from the Chikwa community. Despite the close interaction with the Chikwa community, there is little intermarriage between the two communities. Like other artisan castes, they have seen a decline in their traditional occupation, with many Dabgar now employed as daily wage labourers. The Muslim Dabgar are found mainly in the districts of Saharanpur, Meerut, Etawah, Fatehpur, Jalaun and Allahabad. The community speaks the Braj Bhasha dialect, but some also understand Urdu.

See also

Dabgar

References

Social groups of Uttar Pradesh
Muslim communities of Uttar Pradesh
Dalit Muslim